Thomas Assheton Smith (the younger) (2 August 1776 – 9 September 1858) was an English landowner and all-round sportsman who was notable for being one of the outstanding amateur cricketers of the early 19th century. He was a Tory politician who sat in the House of Commons from 1821 to 1837.  He was also known for his pioneering work on the design of steam yachts in conjunction with the Scottish marine engineer Robert Napier.

Early life
Smith was born in Queen Anne Street, Cavendish Square, Westminster, London. He was the second son of Elizabeth ( Wynn) Smith and Thomas Assheton Smith I (1752–1828), who made his fortune in the Welsh slate industry and was a noted patron of cricket in the early years of Marylebone Cricket Club (MCC) from the 1787 English cricket season. He had five sisters and an elder brother, John, who was expelled from the family after marrying a servant, paving the way for Thomas to become his father's heir. His younger brother, William, saw action at Trafalgar on  but drowned in 1806. 

Smith was educated at Eton between 1783 and 1794, eventually playing for the school's cricket team.  He went on to Christ Church, Oxford where he joined the Bullingdon Club and was a prominent member of its team in 1796.

Career
Smith was elected Member of Parliament representing Andover in 1821 and held the seat until 1831; at the 1832 general election he was elected MP for Caernarvonshire and held the seat until 1837. He was High Sheriff of Wiltshire in 1838.

Cricket career
Smith was a hard hitting right-handed batsman and made 45 known appearances in first-class matches up to the 1820 season. His career spanned the Napoleonic Wars which had a detrimental effect on the game and so reduced his opportunities for playing.

Smith played for the Gentlemen in the inaugural and second Gentlemen v Players matches in 1806.

According to Scores & Biographies (S&B), Smith "being a good hard hitter was pretty successful".  He was also, says S&B, a "crack" shot and a "mighty hunter" who acquired the name of the "British Nimrod". In the contemporary scorecards, he is generally shown as "T A Smith, Esq." whereas his father was usually recorded as "A Smith, Esq."

Foxhunting
From 1806 to 1816, Smith was Master of the Quorn Hunt in Leicestershire, then from 1816 to 1824 of the Burton hounds in Lincolnshire. He established his pack at Penton, near Andover, Hampshire, in 1826. In 1834 he bought many of Sir Thomas Burghley's hounds and in 1842 the whole pack of the Duke of Grafton. He hunted his hounds four days a week and sometimes had two packs out on the same day. In 1830, after the death of his father, he moved his stable and kennels to Tedworth House, also in Hampshire.

Yachting 
Assheton Smith spent summers at his Vaynol Park estate in North Wales, on the shore of the Menai Strait and close to the family's slate quarries at Dinorwic. He had several sailing yachts built, then in 1829 engaged Scottish engineer and shipbuilder Robert Napier to build the first of what would become eight steam yachts, which were among the first vessels of their kind. Assheton Smith contributed to their design, in particular seeking an efficient hull design to maximise speed.

Personal life
On 29 October 1827, Smith married Matilda Webber (d. 1859) of Berkshire. They had no children. During his ownership of the Tedworth estate, the house was rebuilt in ornate classical style.

Smith died at Vaynol Park, Bangor, Caernarvonshire on 9 September 1858 and was buried at Tedworth, where he lived in his later years. His widow died the following year on 18 May 1859.

References

Bibliography
 Arthur Haygarth, Scores & Biographies, Volume 1 (1744–1826), Lillywhite, 1862.

External links 
 
 CricketArchive profile

1776 births
1858 deaths
People educated at Eton College
English cricketers of 1787 to 1825
19th-century English landowners
Gentlemen cricketers
Hampshire cricketers
High Sheriffs of Wiltshire
Masters of foxhounds in England
Marylebone Cricket Club cricketers
Members of the Parliament of the United Kingdom for English constituencies
UK MPs 1820–1826
UK MPs 1826–1830
UK MPs 1830–1831
Conservative Party (UK) MPs for Welsh constituencies
UK MPs 1832–1835
UK MPs 1835–1837
Tory MPs (pre-1834)
Bullingdon Club members